The 1995–96 New Mexico Lobos men's basketball team represented the University of New Mexico as a member of the Western Athletic Conference. The Lobos were coached by head coach Dave Bliss and played their home games at the University Arena, also known as "The Pit", in Albuquerque, New Mexico. New Mexico finished 2nd in the WAC regular season standings and beat Utah in the championship game of the WAC Tournament to receive an automatic bid to the NCAA tournament as No. 7 seed in the East region. After defeating  in the opening round, New Mexico was beaten in the round of 32 by Georgetown, 73–62, to finish with a 28–5 record (14–4 WAC).

Roster

Schedule and results

|-
!colspan=9 style=| Regular season

|-
!colspan=9 style=| WAC tournament

|-
!colspan=9 style=| NCAA tournament

Rankings

References

New Mexico Lobos men's basketball seasons
New Mexico
New Mexico
Lobos
Lobos